Veys (also Romanized as Vais and Wais) is a city and capital of Veys District, in Bavi County, Khuzestan Province, Iran.  At the 2006 census, its population was 14,024, in 2,478 families.

References

Populated places in Bavi County

Cities in Khuzestan Province